Leona Rostenberg (December 28, 1908 – March 17, 2005) was an independent scholar and rare books dealer born in New York, New York.

Biography
Rostenberg was born in the Bronx on December 28, 1908. Her father Adolf was a dermatologist.

Rostenberg and her decades-long friend and business partner Madeleine B. Stern became widely-known in the late 1990s while in their late eighties when their memoir on the rare book trade, Old Books, Rare Friends became a best seller.

In addition to many books on book history and book collecting, Rostenberg wrote numerous articles over the years for many publications including Journal of Modern History, American Historical Review, and Library Quarterly.

Rostenberg died on March 17, 2005, after suffering from heart problems for two years.

Books
 English Publishers in the Graphic Arts, 1599–1700: A Study of the Print-Sellers and Publishers of Engravings, Art and Architectural Manuals, Maps, and Copy-Books, 1963.
 Literary, Political, Scientific, Religious, and Legal Publishing, Printing, and Bookselling in England, 1551–1700: Twelve Studies (two volume set), 1965.
 The Minority Press and the English Crown: A Study in Repression, 1558–1625, 1971.
 An Antiquarian's Credo, 1976.
 Bibliately, 1978.
 The Library of Robert Hooke: The Scientific Book Trade of Restoration England, 1989.

Co-authored with Madeleine B. Stern
 Old and Rare: Thirty Years in the Book Business, 1974.
 Between Boards: New Thoughts on Old Books, 1978.
 Bookman's Quintet: Five Catalogues about Books: Bibliography, Printing History, Booksellers, Libraries, Presses, Collectors, 1979.
 Quest Book—Guest Book: A Biblio-Folly, 1993.
 Connections: Ourselves—Our Books, 1994.
 Old Books in the Old World: Reminiscences of Book-buying Abroad, 1996.
 Old Books, Rare Friends: Two Literary Sleuths and Their Shared Passion, 1997.
 New Worlds in Old Books, 1999.
 Books Have Their Fates, 2001.
 Bookends: Two Women, One Enduring Friendship, 2001.
 From Revolution to Revolution: Perspectives on Publishing and Bookselling 1501-2001, 2002.

See also
 Antiquarian book trade in the United States

References

External links
 Leona Rostenberg and Madeleine B. Stern Papers at Columbia University

1908 births
2005 deaths
20th-century American historians
American feminists
American people of German-Jewish descent
Writers from New York City
American women historians
20th-century American women writers
Historians from New York (state)
21st-century American women